Skalisty is a Russian language word meaning rocky and may refer to:

 Cape Skalisty, near Odyan Bay in the Sea of Okhotsk
 Pik Skalisty, Tajikistan
 Pik Skalisty (Kyrgyzstan)
 Pik Skalisty (Chukotka)
 Skalisty Golets, Kalar Range, Transbaikalia, Russian Far East
 Skalisty Golets (Stanovoy Range), Yakutia
 Skalisty Range, Caucasus
 Skalisty Range, Yakutia
 The former name of Gadzhiyevo, Murmansk Oblast, Russia
 An island in the Valaam archipelago, Lake Ladoga, Russia

ru:Скалистый